Robert H. Burns (born August 14, 1870, in Richland County, Wisconsin) was a member of the Wisconsin State Assembly from 1939 to 1942. Previously, he was Superintendent of Schools of Richland County from 1899 to 1907 and of Rusk County, Wisconsin from 1919 to 1923. He was a Republican.

References

People from Richland County, Wisconsin
People from Rusk County, Wisconsin
Republican Party members of the Wisconsin State Assembly
1870 births
Year of death missing
20th-century American educators
School superintendents in Wisconsin
20th-century American politicians
19th-century American educators